Edhuvum Nadakkum is a 2009 Indian Tamil-language action film written and directed by newcomer R. Rosario. The movie stars noted actor Karthik Kumar, but the rest of the cast is newcomers. The off-beat film released to limited screens on 4 December 2009 garnering mixed reviews.

Cast
 Karthik Kumar as Naga
 Aparna Nair as Pooja
 Suma as Swarna
 Manu Ramalingam as Ramalingam

Reception
Kollywood Today wrote "As of with ‘Edhuvum Nadakkum’, the film has interesting elements. Nonetheless, mediocre promotions for the film will keep it from making it big. But if you're looking out for advice, go ahead and watch this film". Indian Express wrote "It’s an engagingly narrated tale of a disturbed mind exorcising its demons, and about a playful game gone awry. An eerie, bizarre feel is maintained throughout".

References

2009 films
2000s Tamil-language films
Tamil-language psychological thriller films
2009 directorial debut films